The Winter Sports Palace is an ice hockey arena in Sofia, Bulgaria. Opened in 1982, it has a capacity of 4,600 spectators.

External links
Winter Sports Palace on hockeyarenas.net
Winter Sports Palace on eurohockey.com

Indoor arenas in Bulgaria
Indoor ice hockey venues in Bulgaria
Sports venues in Sofia
Venues of the Friendship Games